The white-shouldered starling (Sturnia sinensis) is a species of starling in the family Sturnidae. It breeds in southern China and northern Vietnam; it winters in Southeast Asia. The common name of this bird is derived from the white patch found on the bird's shoulder. 

The bird can be found in Asian countries including Brunei, Cambodia, China, India, Japan, South Korea, Laos, Malaysia, Myanmar, Philippines, Singapore, Taiwan, Thailand and Vietnam. Common names for the white-shouldered starling are gray-backed myna, Chinese myna, Chinese starling, and Mandarin myna.      

The conservation status of the white-shouldered starling is that of "Least Concern". Physical characteristics of the bird include blue eyes, grey bills, and a white patch on the shoulder. Adult males have light brown heads and breasts and white bellies while adult females are darker brown on their backs and bellies. The birds are usually found in larger flocks.

References

BirdLife International 2004. Sturnus sinensis. 2006 IUCN Red List of Threatened Species. Downloaded on 24 July 2007.

white-shouldered starling
Birds of South China
Birds of Vietnam
white-shouldered starling
white-shouldered starling
Taxonomy articles created by Polbot